Pleasant Valley Airport  was a privately owned public-use airport located in Peoria, in Maricopa County, Arizona, United States. It closed in 2022 due to the lease for the land (on state Trust Land) not being renewed.

Facilities and aircraft 
It had four dirt runways:

 5L/23R measuring 4,200 x 100 feet (1,280 x 30 m)
 5C/23C measuring 4,200 x 100 feet (1,280 x 30 m)
 5R/23L measuring 4,200 x 100 feet (1,280 x 30 m)
 14/32 measuring 2,400 x 100 feet (732 x 30 m)

For the 12-month period ending April 24, 2008, the airport had 75,000 general aviation aircraft operations, an average of 205 per day. At that time there were 19 aircraft based at this airport: 14 single-engine and 5 ultralight.

References

External links 

 

Airports in Maricopa County, Arizona